Mohammad Shahabi (1922–1973), also known as Soltan Almagham, was a renowned Ahwazi musician and Dulcimer player. He was born in 1341 Hijri (1922/23) in Veys, belonging to the county of Bavi in Ahvaz, Khuzestan, Iran.
Because of his reputation in musical performance he was given the honorific title "Soltan Almagham Alarabi Al-Ahwazi", which means "king of Arabic style music in Ahwaz".
After 50 years of playing the Dulcimer, and 2 years of suffering cancer, he died in 1393 Hijri (1973).

Life 

Shahabi dominated most of the original country music styles, e.g. the Hakimi style. Accompanied by the "Tarath Al-Ahwaz" band, he participated in 1392 hijri (1972) in a festival in Kerman where he achieved first place.

Shahabi also participated in some musical festivals abroad. He played for many of the most popular singers in Al-Ahwaz, like Abd al-Amir Edris, Ali Neisi, Hamdi Saleh and so on.
After his death the chief of music society and the CEO of Ministry of Culture and Islamic of the country sent their condolence messages.
Also it was agreed that one night of the Musical Festival in the country, would be named in honor of him.
Some artistic activists has expressed their dissatisfaction to not attending him by provincial officials.

References 

1922 births
1973 deaths
20th-century Iranian musicians
People from Khuzestan Province